Armando Castaingdebat Colombo (born 25 October 1959 in Trinidad, Uruguay) is a Uruguayan veterinarian and political figure of the National Party.

Graduating from the University of the Republic with a Doctorate of Veterinary Medicine, he has been a member of the National Party since the late 1980s. A significant factor in the political work of Castaingdebat is the sizeable agricultural interests which are present in the economic and labour-related life of Flores Department.

Political career
In the 2005 municipal elections, Walter Echeverría was elected Intendant of Flores, however, he died before he took office. Therefore, Castaingdebat took over as the first substitute. He was reelected to the office in the 2010 election.

He served as President of the National Congress of Intendants between 2013 and 2014.

He was nominated for the Chamber of Representatives for the 48th Legislature in the 2014 general election, being elected. He assumed as National Representative on February 15, 2015.

Castaingdebat is Intendent (Spanish: 'Intendente') of the Flores Department of Uruguay. By a large margin, this is the most sparsely populated of the country's 19 departments.

After Luis Lacalle Pou's victory in the 2019 general election, he was appointed Deputy Minister of Social Development, accompanied by Pablo Bartol, who serves as Minister. On May 3, 2021, he resigned from his post, after his son-in-law, Martín Lema, took office as minister.

Other activities
In the University Elections of the University of the Republic, held on May 4, 2016, he was elected as a substitute in the Cloister of the Veterinary School in the order of graduates and under the slogan Corriente Gremial Universitaria - Egresados.

On 21 August 2018, FIFA appointed a normalisation committee for the Uruguayan Football Association (AUF). Three persons were put in charge: Castaingdebat, Senator Pedro Bordaberry, and former professional association football player Andrés Scotti.

See also

 Departments of Uruguay
 Politics of Uruguay
 Flores Department#Notable people

References

External links 

 Armando Castaingdebat's virtual office

1959 births
Living people
People from Trinidad, Uruguay
National Party (Uruguay) politicians
Members of the Chamber of Representatives of Uruguay (2015–2020)
Members of the Chamber of Representatives of Uruguay (2020–2025)
Intendants of Flores Department
Uruguayan veterinarians